Vzemi ali pusti ("Take It or Leave It") is the Slovenian version of Deal or No Deal, which is produced by POP TV. The show originally had a top prize of 15,000,000 tolarjev (about US$82,000), but it has changed to €70,000 (about US$97,000) since Slovenia's switch to the euro on New Year's Day, 2007.

Case Values (new)

Case Values (old)

External links
Vzemi ali pusti

Deal or No Deal
2005 Slovenian television series debuts
2007 Slovenian television series endings
Slovenian television series
2000s Slovenian television series
Pop (Slovenian TV channel) original programming